Land Raiders is a 1970 American Western film directed by Nathan Juran and starring Telly Savalas, George Maharis, Arlene Dahl and Janet Landgard. It was produced by Charles H. Schneer, who was best known for producing most of Ray Harryhausen's features, three of which were also directed by Juran.

Plot
In the 1870s Arizona town of Forge River, cattle baron Vince Carden (Telly Savalas) is estranged from his brother, Paul (George Maharis). The men are of Mexican ancestry but Vince has renounced that part of his heritage. Vince hates Native Americans and pays out bounties on Indian scalps, then benefits financially by being able to buy up the cheap land caused by the strife and bloodshed. Paul is rudderless, haunted by a past romance that ended with the death of his lover, which some people think he was responsible for.

A wagon train joined by Paul is attacked by braves in retaliation for a raid that was fermented by Vince. The only survivor besides Paul is a woman returning home from her education back east. Later, Vince arranges to murder a negotiator sent from Washington to arrange a land-sharing agreement with the Indians, in a manner the Indians will be blamed for. Paul witnesses the attack but, when the townspeople gather to decide what to do about it, does not explicitly tell them what he saw.

Vince urges an all-out attack on a largely defenseless Indian village. The town sheriff is on Vince’s payroll, and the commander of the nearby fort goes along with Vince’s plan. The massacre that follows prompts a massive retaliatory assault on Forge River by the Indians, who somehow know that Vince’s machinations are responsible for their woes.

Cast
 Telly Savalas as Vince Cardenas
 George Maharis as Paul Cardenas
 Arlene Dahl as Martha Cardenas
 Janet Landgard as Kate Mayfield
 Guy Rolfe as Major Tanner
 Paul Picerni as Carney 
 Phil Brown as Sheriff John Mayfield
 George Coulouris as Cardenas
 H.P Picerni as Arturo
 Jocelyn Lane as Luisa Rojas
 Fernando Rey as Priet
 Robert Carricart as Julio Rojas 
 John Clark as Ace
 Charles Stalnaker as Frank Willis
 Marcella St. Amant as Luisa Montoya
 Gustavo Rojo as Indio

See also
 List of American films of 1970

References

External links

1970 films
Films directed by Nathan Juran
Films scored by Bruno Nicolai
Columbia Pictures films
1970 Western (genre) films
American Western (genre) films
Films shot in Almería
Films produced by Charles H. Schneer
1970s English-language films
1970s American films